José Vítor Moreira Semedo (born 11 January 1985) is a Portuguese former professional footballer who played as a defensive midfielder.

He spent most of his career in England, playing for a whole decade with Charlton Athletic and Sheffield Wednesday of the Football League.

Club career

Sporting CP
A product of Sporting CP's youth system, Semedo was born in Setúbal and made his professional debut with modest Casa Pia AC, in the Lisbon area. In the 2005–06 season he served another loan stint, now with C.D. Feirense of the Segunda Liga.

Semedo was loaned again for the 2006–07 campaign, moving to Serie A's Cagliari Calcio. He made his competitive debut in the Coppa Italia, but would only appear three times in the league, the first as a late substitute in a 3–1 away loss against A.C. Milan on 21 April 2007. He was sent off in his last match, a 2–1 defeat at Ascoli Calcio 1898, with the Sardinians barely avoiding relegation.

England
In 2007, Semedo signed a four-year contract with Charlton Athletic on a free transfer. Although touted as a central defender when he signed, he played mainly as a defensive midfielder for the Football League Championship side, and scored his first goal in a 4–0 win over Tranmere Rovers on 29 August 2009, with the team now in League One.

Semedo was crowned Charlton's Player of the Year in May 2011, picking up 43% of the votes in what was the club's worst season for a number of decades. However, manager Chris Powell could not offer him assurances that he would be a key member in the following season, as he aimed to create a more fluid midfield, and so, on 7 July, the player joined Sheffield Wednesday also of the English third tier, again as a free agent.

In his first season with the Owls, which ended in promotion to the Championship after finishing second behind Charlton, Semedo was voted Player of the Year and League One PFA Fans' Player of the Year. From 2013 to 2016, he was given one-year extensions to his contract.

Starting in 2015, Semedo played less often for the Hillsborough club, due to the acquisitions of Ross Wallace, Barry Bannan and Álex López. The first of those players reflected in April that "Semedo trains like an animal every day and doesn’t slacken off, even though he is not playing or in the squad".

Vitória Setúbal
On 25 May 2017, aged 32, Semedo was released. On 24 August he returned to his country after 11 years, on a two-year deal with Vitória de Setúbal. He made his Primeira Liga debut on 10 September, replacing João Amaral for the last 19 minutes of the 2–0 home victory over S.C. Braga.

Having played 55 games and scored twice for his hometown club, Semedo signed a new two-year contract in June 2019. On 23 January 2023, the 38-year-old announced his retirement from professional football.

International career
Of Cape Verdean descent, Semedo represented the Portuguese under-21 team during the 2006 UEFA European Championship. In the only match he played he was sent off due to an aggressive foul, and the country lost against Serbia and Montenegro and failed to qualify from its group.

Personal life
During his formative years at Sporting, Semedo became a close friend of Cristiano Ronaldo, later of Manchester United, Real Madrid, Juventus F.C. and Portugal fame. The former cited the latter as a major factor for his life not having taken a turn for the worse, if he had been dismissed from the youth academy.

Semedo's wife Soraia died in September 2021, having been hospitalised due to an infection.

Club statistics

Honours
Sheffield Wednesday
League One runner-up: 2011–12

Individual
Charlton Athletic Player of The Year: 2010–11
Sheffield Wednesday Player of The Year: 2011–12
League One PFA Fans' Player of The Year: 2011–12

References

External links

1985 births
Living people
Portuguese sportspeople of Cape Verdean descent
Sportspeople from Setúbal
Black Portuguese sportspeople
Portuguese footballers
Association football defenders
Association football midfielders
Association football utility players
Primeira Liga players
Liga Portugal 2 players
Segunda Divisão players
Sporting CP B players
Sporting CP footballers
Casa Pia A.C. players
C.D. Feirense players
Vitória F.C. players
Serie A players
Cagliari Calcio players
English Football League players
Charlton Athletic F.C. players
Sheffield Wednesday F.C. players
Portugal youth international footballers
Portugal under-21 international footballers
Portugal B international footballers
Portuguese expatriate footballers
Expatriate footballers in Italy
Expatriate footballers in England
Portuguese expatriate sportspeople in Italy
Portuguese expatriate sportspeople in England